Alan Michael Ritchson (born November 28, 1982) is an American actor, model, singer, songwriter and producer. He made his acting debut as Aquaman / Arthur Curry on The CW superhero series Smallville (2005–2010), where he appeared as a guest star between the fifth and tenth seasons. Ritchson gained further prominence for portraying Thad Castle on the Spike TV sitcom Blue Mountain State (2010–2012), a role he reprised in the 2016 film sequel. He also headlined the SyFy action series Blood Drive (2017). In 2018, he returned to superhero television as Hank Hall / Hawk on the DC Universe / HBO Max series Titans. Ritchson left Titans in 2021 and, in 2022, began portraying the title character on the Amazon Prime Video series Reacher.

Outside of television, Ritchson played Raphael in the 2014 Teenage Mutant Ninja Turtles reboot and its 2016 sequel, along with appearing in The Hunger Games: Catching Fire (2013). He made his directorial debut and co-starred in the action-comedy Dark Web: Cicada 3301 (2021).

Early life and education
Ritchson was born on November 28, 1982, in Grand Forks, North Dakota. He is the son of Vickie Ritchson, a high school teacher and David Ritchson, a retired U.S. Air Force chief master sergeant. He is the second of three boys. During his childhood, his family moved to Rantoul, Illinois. At age 10, Ritchson's family settled in Niceville, Florida. He attended Niceville High School and graduated in 2001. In a 2013 interview with Indonesian magazine Da Man, he stated that he once obtained a full music scholarship. From 1999 to 2003, he attended as a dual-enrollment student and graduated with an Associate of Arts degree at Okaloosa Walton Community College, now Northwest Florida State College. He was a member of the Fine Arts division's Soundsations and Madrigal Singers.

Career

Modeling
He began his modeling career in the Abercrombie & Fitch catalogue.

Television

Alan Ritchson first came to the attention of the public in 2004 when he appeared on American Idol as one of the top 87 contestants in the third season before being cut in Hollywood. His appearance on the show was noted for his striptease in one episode in which he wooed judge Paula Abdul.

His television acting credits include a recurring guest star role on the television series Smallville as Arthur Curry, a.k.a. Aquaman, a small role as an army officer in the 2006 Hallmark Channel movie Though None Go with Me alongside Cheryl Ladd, and the role of Lucian Manet in the 2009 Lifetime original film Nora Roberts' Midnight Bayou. His role in Smallville marked the first time that an actor portrayed Aquaman in an officially licensed live-action production. His Smallville co-star, Justin Hartley, has since portrayed Aquaman in an unaired pilot of the same name. Ritchson reprised his role as Aquaman in the final season. In 2009, he appeared on a third-season episode of Starz's Head Case in which he played a male stripper. Ritchson also made an appearance on CSI: Miami, in which he played a dead victim in episode 19 of season 8. In 2011, he appeared in an episode of season 3 of 90210 as a love interest for main character Teddy Montgomery (Trevor Donovan).

In 2010, he started playing the main role of Thad Castle, the captain of a college football team, in Spike TV's Blue Mountain State. He stayed on the show until it was cancelled after its third season in February 2012. He also appeared in a number of television shows, including Hawaii Five-0.  In 2015, Ritchson became a regular on the NBC variety show I Can Do That (based on the Israeli variety show) alongside Nicole Scherzinger, Ciara, Joe Jonas, Cheryl Burke and Jeff Dye, and hosted by Marlon Wayans. In 2016, he appeared in "Nosedive", an episode of the anthology series Black Mirror.

In 2017, he played the main character in the Syfy series Blood Drive. In 2018, Ritchson played the recurring role of Hank Hall / Hawk in the DC Universe series Titans. His initial deal was for just two episodes but he was promoted to a series regular for the second season. Producers decided to reduce the number of characters and Ritchson was written out of the series.

In 2020, Ritchson was announced to be portraying Jack Reacher in an eponymous series on Amazon Prime.

Films

Movie credits include a role in the 2006 film The Butcher, as well as a minor role in 2009's Fired Up! In 2007, director Robert Zemeckis used Ritchson for his facial image, physique and movement for actor Ray Winstone of the title character of Beowulf.

Ritchson portrayed Gloss, a tribute in the 75th Hunger Games, in The Hunger Games: Catching Fire (2013). Ritchson also portrayed Raphael in Teenage Mutant Ninja Turtles, a reboot to the Teenage Mutant Ninja Turtles film series after the four previous films. Ritchson would later criticize producers of the new TMNT live-action films, claiming they mistreated him and other actors portraying the turtles during and after filming.

He returned to his role as Thad Castle in the Blue Mountain State movie, Blue Mountain State: The Rise of Thadland. Ritchson co-starred in Rooster Teeth Production's first feature-length movie—the science fiction comedy Lazer Team in January 2016. He also played a medium role in The Wedding Ringer.

In 2018, Ritchson was announced as the director, co-writer, and producer of Dark Web: Cicada 3301, a comedy-thriller film inspired by the eponymous organization. He also co-starred as an NSA agent. The film will be the first original project of Phreaker Films, a film fund run by Ritchson. The rights for Dark Web: Cicada 3301 were acquired by Lionsgate in 2020, who released the film digitally on March 12, 2021.

Other work
Other projects include an independent album called This Is Next Time, released in late 2005 and appearing in a Russian commercial for Orbit gum.
Ritchson also appears in a web series entitled, Enormous Friends with his Blue Mountain State co-star, Rob Ramsay.

Personal life
Ritchson resides in Florida with his wife Catherine and their three children. Ritchson has spoken openly about his struggles with bipolar disorder. 

Ritchson is a Christian.

Filmography

Film

Television

Video games
 Beowulf: The Game (2007), as Beowulf (character model)

Discography
Albums
 This Is Next Time (2006)

References

External links

 

21st-century American male actors
American Idol participants
American male film actors
Male models from North Dakota
American male singers
American male television actors
American male voice actors
Songwriters from North Dakota
Aquaman
1982 births
Living people
Male actors from Florida
Male actors from North Dakota
People from Rantoul, Illinois
People from Grand Forks, North Dakota
People from Niceville, Florida
American people of Czech descent